Dušan Hauptman (born 17 September 1960) is a former professional basketball player who played as a shooting guard.

Career
Between 1982 and 1998, Hauptman spent seventeen consecutive seasons with Smelt Olimpija. With Olimpija, he managed to win the 1993–94 FIBA European Cup, and also finished third in the 1997 FIBA Euroleague Final Four.

Hauptman was a member of the Slovenian national team, with whom he played at the EuroBasket 1995 in Greece.

References

1960 births
Living people
Basketball players from Ljubljana
Slovenian men's basketball players
KK Olimpija players
Shooting guards